GMI may refer to:

Educational and research institutions 
 General Motors Institute of Technology, in Flint, Michigan, United States
 Genomic Medicine Institute, at the Cleveland Clinic, Ohio, United States
 Georgia Medical Institute, in Georgia, United States
 Georgia Military Institute, in Marietta, Georgia, United States
 German-Malaysian Institute, in Malaysia
 Gorgas Memorial Institute for Health Studies, a medical research institution in Panama
 Greenwich Maritime Institute, of the University of Greenwich, England
 Gregor Mendel Institute, a biological research institute in Austria

Enterprises and organizations
 General Mills Inc
 George C. Marshall Institute, an American think tank
 Global Methane Initiative, an environmental organization
 GMInsideNews, an internet forum focused on General Motors
 Grace Ministries International, a Christian organization
 Greater Ministries International, an American Christian ministry that ran a Ponzi scheme
 Groupement Mixte d'Intervention, a French Cold-War-era counter-intelligence service

Transport 
 Gasmata Airport, in Papua New Guinea
 Germania (airline), a German airline
 Gond Umri railway station, in Maharashtra, India

Other uses 
 GamesMaster International, a British magazine
 Giant magnetoimpedance
 Global microbial identifier
 Global Militarization Index
GPM Microwave Imager (see Global Precipitation Measurement)
 Graded motor imagery, a therapy for Complex regional pain syndrome (CRPS)
 Guaranteed minimum income
 .gmi, a file extension used by Gemini (protocol)